Lucien Dalsace (14 January 1893 – 30 July 1980) was a French film actor.

Selected filmography
 Prince Jean (1928)
 Temptation (1929)
 Immediate Call (1939)

References

Bibliography
 Goble, Alan. The Complete Index to Literary Sources in Film. Walter de Gruyter, 1999.

External links

1893 births
1980 deaths
French male film actors
French male silent film actors
20th-century French male actors
People from Chatou